The WQXR All-Day Bach Organ Marathon was a marathon performance of the nearly complete organ works of Johann Sebastian Bach, hosted by WQXR-FM.  The series of recitals was held at St. Peter Lutheran Church in Manhattan from 7:00 A.M. on November 22, 2014 to 1:00 A.M the next day.  The organ was built in 1978 by Klais Orgelbau.  Grammy-winning Juilliard professor and department chair, Paul Jacobs, curated the event.  The works were divided among Jacobs, eighteen of his Juilliard students (including alumni), and Juilliard faculty member (and alumnus) David Enlow. Fourteen recitals consisted of over 150 preludes (fantasias, toccatas), fugues, chorales, concerti, and other forms.

Media

The organ marathon received attention on Facebook and Twitter through the use of hashtags #bachstock and #bachathon.  The marathon was featured in articles online and in print by The Wall Street Journal, The New Yorker, and The New York Times, as well as several others.

Performers 
 David Ball
 Chelsea Chen*
 David Crean*
 Isabelle Demers*
 David Enlow, Juilliard faculty*
 Daniel Ficarri
 Michael Hey*
 Christopher Houlihan*
 Ryan Jackson*
 Paul Jacobs, Chair, Juilliard Organ Department
 Ryan Kennedy
 Yinying Luo
 Colin MacKnight
 Griffin McMahon
 Raymond Nagem
 Alexander Pattavina
 Benjamin Sheen*
 James Wetzel*
 Janet Yieh
 Gregory Zelek

Juilliard alumni (at the time of performance)*

Program

See also
 List of Bach festivals
 List of early music festivals
 List of Bach's organ compositions
 Description of Bach's organ compositions

External links
 #bachathon on Twitter
 #bachstock on Twitter

References

2014 in American music
Bach festivals
Organs (music)
Music festivals established in 2014